Robbie Neale (born April 17, 1953) is a Canadian retired ice hockey forward who played 59 games in the World Hockey Association.

Career statistics

External links
 

1953 births
Living people
Brandon Wheat Kings players
Canadian ice hockey forwards
Cleveland Crusaders draft picks
Cleveland Crusaders players
Detroit Red Wings draft picks
Ice hockey people from Winnipeg
Winnipeg Jets (WHA) players